From Madrid to Heaven is a 1952 Spanish musical comedy film directed by Rafael Gil and starring María de los Ángeles Morales, Gustavo Rojo and Manolo Morán. It is set in early 20th-century Madrid.

The film's sets were designed by Enrique Alarcón.

Cast

Release 

See also 
 List of Spanish films of 1952

References

Bibliography 
 Bentley, Bernard. A Companion to Spanish Cinema. Boydell & Brewer 2008.

External links 
 

1952 musical comedy films
Spanish musical comedy films
1950s Spanish-language films
Films directed by Rafael Gil
Suevia Films films
Films scored by Juan Quintero Muñoz
Spanish black-and-white films
Films set in Madrid
Films set in the 20th century
1950s Spanish films